List of the National Register of Historic Places listings in Greene County, New York

This is intended to be a complete list of properties and districts listed on the National Register of Historic Places in Greene County, New York.  The locations of National Register properties and districts (at least for all showing latitude and longitude coordinates below) may be seen in a map by clicking on "Map of all coordinates".  Two properties, the Pieter Bronck House and the Thomas Cole House, are further designated U.S. National Historic Landmarks, and the latter is also a National Historic Site.



Listings county-wide

|}

See also

National Register of Historic Places listings in New York

References

Greene County